Trebloc is an unincorporated community in Chickasaw County, Mississippi, United States.

History
Trebloc is named after a historic Chickasaw-Scots family located in the area named "Colbert", who  used letters in their name to create the town name "Trebloc" (an ananym).

A small United States post office is located at Trebloc, as is the historic house of a doctor. Trebloc post office was established June 23, 1894, with Joseph M. Colbert as first postmaster.

See also
 List of geographic names derived from anagrams and ananyms

References

Unincorporated communities in Chickasaw County, Mississippi
Unincorporated communities in Mississippi